MedExpress is an online doctor & pharmacy founded in December 2013. MedExpress offers prescription-only medications (POMs) through an online consultation which is reviewed by a licensed doctor. MedExpress operates a same day delivery service in London with deliveries as fast as 90 minutes making it one of the fast online doctor services in the country.

The act of remote prescribing is regulated by  the Care Quality Commission, which ensures that all medical practitioners meet fundamental standards of quality and safety.

Drone delivery
In August 2017, MedExpress revealed that it was in talks with the regulators to trial drone delivery
. This would allow time sensitive prescription medicines such as the emergency hormonal contraception to be shipped at any of time of the day to remote regions. The company is waiting for approval from the CAA to approve its use.

Bitcoin payments
In December 2017, MedExpress began allowing payment of prescription medications using Bitcoin. The company still requires identity checks to be performed on customers using Bitcoin payments, so the transactions will not be anonymous.

Regulation
In the UK online pharmacies are regulated by the General Pharmaceutical Council (GPHC) and the Medicines and Healthcare products Regulatory Agency (MHRA).

MedExpress is the 115th pharmacy in the UK to join the MHRA logo scheme.

MedExpress is registered with the General Pharmaceutical Council and operates a pharmacy premises in Central London. The company participates in the voluntary internet pharmacy logo scheme.

References

External links
 Official website

Companies based in the City of London
Retail companies established in 2013
Pharmacies of the United Kingdom
Online pharmacies